Live is a live performance album by Nekropolis, released in 1983 by Schneeball.

Track listing

Personnel
Adapted from the Live liner notes.

Musicians
 Rudi Haunreiter – drums, percussion
 Peter Frohmader – bass guitar, Chapman Stick, tape, cover art
 Tillmann Obermaier – electric guitar, shehnai, horn

Production and additional personnel
 Jürgen Jung – voice
 Sonja Lang – recording, mixing
 Nekropolis – production
 Julius Schittenhelm – recording, mixing

Release history

References

External links 
 

1983 live albums
Nekropolis albums